Larkin Covered Bridge is a , Burr truss wooden covered bridge located outside Chester Springs, Chester County, Pennsylvania, near the village of Eagle. The bridge, which originally crossed over Marsh Creek, now spans a dry ditch and is a feature of the Upper Uwchlan Township trail system.

History 
The bridge was rebuilt in 1881.

In 1972, the Commonwealth of Pennsylvania acquired the Larkin Bridge and relocated it  to the north prior to the evacuation of Milford Mills and the creation of Marsh Creek Lake in Marsh Creek State Park. The bridge was used as a pedestrian crossing between two day camps in the new state park. Larkin Bridge was listed on the National Register of Historic Places in 1980.

In 1998, Upper Uwchlan Township acquired the bridge and in 2006 the township government worked with developers (Toll Brothers, Orleans and K. Hovnanian) to dismantle and relocate the bridge. Larkin Covered Bridge was rebuilt on the trail path next to the entrance to the Byers Station housing development on Graphite Mine Road near the village of Eagle.

References 
 

Covered bridges on the National Register of Historic Places in Pennsylvania
Covered bridges in Chester County, Pennsylvania
Bridges completed in 1881
Wooden bridges in Pennsylvania
Bridges in Chester County, Pennsylvania
1881 establishments in Pennsylvania
Relocated buildings and structures in Pennsylvania
National Register of Historic Places in Chester County, Pennsylvania
Road bridges on the National Register of Historic Places in Pennsylvania
Burr Truss bridges in the United States